ESO 603-G21 is a candidate polar-ring galaxy.

References

Polar-ring galaxies
Aquarius (constellation)